Randall Mann (born January 21, 1972) is an American poet.

Life and career 

Born in Provo, Utah, the only son of Olympic Track and Field medalist Ralph Mann, Mann grew up in Kentucky and Florida, and earned a BA and an MFA from the University of Florida. Since 1998, he has lived in San Francisco.

Publications and critical reception 

Mann's poems have appeared in numerous periodicals—including The Kenyon Review, The New Republic, The Paris Review, Poetry, and The Washington Post—and he has published four full-length poetry collections. His first collection, Complaint in the Garden, published by Zoo Press in 2004, won the 2003 Kenyon Review Prize in Poetry. Mann's next collection, Breakfast with Thom Gunn, published by the University of Chicago Press in 2009, was praised by the Los Angeles Times: "craft and bravura mix well" and "the clarity startles." The book was named a finalist for the California Book Award and the Lambda Literary Award for Gay Poetry. Mann's next two collections were published by Persea Books. Straight Razor, published in 2013, was described by the Los Angeles Times as full of "breathtaking honesty," and was named a best poetry book of the year by the Kansas City Star and a finalist for the Lambda Literary Award. Proprietary, published in 2017, was a finalist for the 2018 Lambda Literary Award and the Northern California Book Award. In a review of Proprietary, Tess Taylor on NPR's All Things Considered said that "Mann imagines anew what it means to connect or to feel at a loss in the age of the Internet"; Nathan Blansett in The Kenyon Review wrote that "Proprietary shows Mann at his most incisive"; and Walter Holland, writing in Lambda Literary, wrote "Mann's work should be admired for its ferocity, its craft, and its unabashedly gay point of view."

Mann is also the co-author of the textbook Writing Poems, Seventh Edition, published by Pearson Longman in 2007.

Honors and awards 

In 2004, Mann was named to the OUT 100 list by OUT Magazine. He was named a Laureate of the San Francisco Public Library in 2010. In 2013, he received the J. Howard and Barbara M. J. Wood Prize from Poetry Magazine.

Published works

Poetry collections 

A Better Life. Persea Books, 2021. .

Proprietary. Persea Books, 2017. .

Straight Razor. Persea Books, 2013. .

Breakfast with Thom Gunn. University of Chicago Press, 2009. .

Complaint in the Garden. Zoo Press, 2004. .

Co-authored book 

Writing Poems, Seventh Edition. With Michelle Boisseau & Robert Wallace. Pearson Longman, 2007. .

References

External links 
Randall Mann at the Poetry Foundation
Randall Mann at the Academy of American Poets
Interview, The Adroit Journal
Interview, Literary Hub
Interview, 32 Poems

American male poets
University of Florida alumni
Living people
1972 births
American gay writers
American LGBT poets
LGBT people from Utah
21st-century American poets
21st-century American male writers
Gay poets